Piotr Pustelnik (born 12 July 1951 in Łódź, Poland) is a Polish alpine and high-altitude climber. He is the 20th man to climb all fourteen eight-thousanders.

Major ascents

External links

 Piotr Pustelnik – famous Polish climber
 Annapurna Dream 2010
 Interviews with Piotr Pustelnik

1951 births
Living people
Polish mountain climbers
Polish summiters of Mount Everest
Summiters of all 14 eight-thousanders
Sportspeople from Łódź